The Swift Run Formation is a geologic formation in Virginia and West Virginia. It dates back to the Neoproterozoic.

References
 Generalized Stratigraphic Chart for West Virginia

Geology of West Virginia
Geology of Virginia